Barbora Krejčíková and Kateřina Siniaková defeated Caty McNally and Taylor Townsend in the final, 3–6, 7–5, 6–1 to win the women's doubles tennis title at the 2022 US Open. With the win, they became the first women's pair (and the third and fourth women overall, after Gigi Fernández and Pam Shriver) to complete the career Super Slam in doubles. It was their sixth major title together.

Samantha Stosur and Zhang Shuai were the defending champions, but did not compete together. Stosur partnered Latisha Chan, but lost to Miyu Kato and Aldila Sutjiadi in the first round. Zhang partnered Marta Kostyuk, but lost to Desirae Krawczyk and Demi Schuurs in the third round.

Siniaková regained the WTA number 1 doubles ranking at the end of the tournament. Coco Gauff, Elise Mertens, Jeļena Ostapenko and Giuliana Olmos were also in contention for the top ranking.

This tournament marked the final professional doubles appearance for 14-time major doubles champion, three-time Olympic doubles gold medalist, and former doubles world No. 1 Serena Williams; partnering with her sister Venus Williams, she lost in the first round to Lucie Hradecká and Linda Nosková.

This was the first edition of US Open to feature a 10-point tie-break, when the score reaches six games all in the deciding set. Lyudmyla Kichenok and Ostapenko defeated Panna Udvardy and Tamara Zidanšek in the first round in the first women's doubles main-draw 10-point tie-break at US Open.

Seeds

Draw

Finals

Top half

Section 1

Section 2

Bottom half

Section 3

Section 4

Other entry information

Wild cards

Protected ranking

Alternates

Withdrawals
  Marie Bouzková /  Laura Siegemund → replaced by  Han Xinyun /  Evgeniya Rodina
  Lucie Hradecká /  Sania Mirza → replaced by  Lucie Hradecká /  Linda Nosková
  Anhelina Kalinina /  Elena Rybakina → replaced by  Catherine Harrison /  Ingrid Neel
  Anett Kontaveit /  Shelby Rogers → replaced by  Alicia Barnett /  Olivia Nicholls
  Jasmine Paolini /  Martina Trevisan → replaced by  Wang Xinyu /  Zhu Lin

See also 
2022 US Open – Day-by-day summaries

References

External links
Main draw

Women's Doubles
US Open - Women's Doubles
US Open (tennis) by year – Women's doubles